Tod Markey Brown (born June 27, 1971) is an American baseball coach and former pitcher, currently serving as head baseball coach of the New Mexico Lobos. He played college baseball for Arizona for four seasons, helping the team to the 1992 Pac-10 Conference Championship and falling just shy of the 1993 College World Series. He then served as the head coach of the North Dakota State Bison (2008–2021).

Early life, education, and pro baseball career
Born in Charleston, South Carolina, Brown grew up in Tucson, Arizona and graduated from Sabino High School in 1989. At the University of Arizona, Brown was a left-handed pitcher for Arizona Wildcats baseball from 1991 to 1994. Setting a school record with 35 appearances, Brown had six wins and eight saves for Arizona's 1993 College World Series runner-up team. Brown graduated from Arizona in 1994 with a bachelor's degree in regional development.

Not selected in the 1994 Major League Baseball draft, Brown played two seasons of independent league baseball after college. With the Brainerd Bears of the North Central League in 1994, Brown had 17 appearances (12 starts), a 5–2 record, and 3.15 ERA on a Bears team that won the North Central League playoffs. After the season, Brown later signed with the Cleveland Indians but was released during 1995 spring training due to an injury.

Returning to baseball in 1996, Brown had four appearances with three starts, an 0–1 record, and 9.88 ERA for the Minot Mallards of the Prairie League. In 1997, Brown completed a post-baccalaureate degree in education at Chapman University.

Coaching career

Early coaching career (1997–2007)
From 1997 to 1998, Brown was an assistant coach at Sabino High School, helping Sabino win the 1997 Arizona 4A state championship. Staying in Tucson, Brown returned to the University of Arizona on August 18, 1998 as volunteer assistant coach under head coach Jerry Stitt.

Then from 2000 to 2007, Brown was pitching coach and recruiting coordinator at Bowling Green. Bowling Green won back-to-back Mid-American Conference East Division titles in 2001 and 2002.

North Dakota State (2008–2021)
On July 3, 2007, North Dakota State University hired Brown as head coach of North Dakota State Bison baseball. Brown inherited a program that had three straight losing seasons; the North Dakota State athletic program was also in the final year of a four-year transition from Division II to Division I.

In his first five seasons, North Dakota State consistently improved its win total, reaching a program record 40 wins in 2012. On February 18, 2012, North Dakota State upset no. 5 Arizona 8–2 for the first win in program history over a ranked Division I opponent.

Then in 2014, despite a fifth and last place finish in conference standings, Brown led North Dakota State to two new historical firsts: the Summit League Tournament title, which resulted in an automatic NCAA Division I Tournament bid. The 2021 North Dakota State baseball team reached a new program high 42 wins with the second Summit Tournament title and NCAA Tournament.

Brown had a 341–350 record in 14 seasons at North Dakota State from 2008 to 2021.

New Mexico (2022–present)
On June 17, 2021, Brown was named the head baseball coach at the University of New Mexico.

Head coaching record

See also
List of current NCAA Division I baseball coaches

References

External links

1971 births
Arizona Wildcats baseball coaches
Arizona Wildcats baseball players
Baseball pitchers
Bowling Green Falcons baseball coaches
Living people
North Dakota State Bison baseball coaches
New Mexico Lobos baseball coaches
Sportspeople from Tucson, Arizona
Sportspeople from Charleston, South Carolina
Baseball players from Arizona
Baseball coaches from Arizona
High school baseball coaches in the United States
Brainerd Bears players
Minot Mallards players